Pranab Roy  (born 10 February 1963) is a former Indian cricketer who played two Test matches for India.

Early life 
He received his early education at Rama Chandra School in Kolkata. His father Pankaj Roy taught him cricket when he was 5 years old. He took interest in Cricket at the age of 9. His coach Sundar Biswas coached him. He was known for his prolific batting. His idol was Mushtaq Ali.

He had an accident on 5 November 1975 when he was 18 years old where he was playing cricket with his friends and his leather ball got hit on his face. His teeth got fallen down and his nose bled heavily. He was rushed to a city hospital in Kolkata and he had a facial surgery. Presently he runs Pankaj Roy Cricket Academy in Salt Lake.

References 

Living people
India Test cricketers
Indian cricketers
East Zone cricketers
India national cricket team selectors
Bengal cricketers
1963 births
Cricketers from Kolkata